Flatt's Inlet is a small channel in Bermuda which joins Harrington Sound with the Atlantic Ocean. It lies almost exactly between the territory's two municipalities, Hamilton and St. George's.

Harrington Sound is almost entirely surrounded by the Bermudian mainland, and is only open to the sea at this inlet at its southwesternmost point, although much of the sound's water flows through subterranean channels. Despite  this, the water in the inlet is fast moving, carrying water in and out from the sound as the tide ebbs and flows. A bridge (Flatt's Bridge) crosses the inlet, and the small settlement of Flatt's Village is located on its south bank. The Bermuda Aquarium, Museum and Zoo (BAMZ) is located on its north side.

Bodies of water of Bermuda
Inlets of North America